Hall is a town in the district of Hall, in the Australian Capital Territory in Australia. Is situated on the north side of the Australian Capital Territory. It is surrounded by open country and has a rural appearance. Hall has retained a village character. The town features historic buildings that existed before the establishment of Canberra.

History
The area that is now known as Hall lies on the traditional lands of the Ngunnawal people.

In 1826, George Palmer established his Palmerville estate in Ginninginderry, with a homestead located on the banks of Ginninderra Creek, adjacent to the present-day suburb of Giralang. The estate encompassed much of what is now Belconnen and southern Gungahlin. It adjoined the Charnwood estate to the west and Yarralumla estate to the east.

By 1861, a store, post office, cottages and homestead had been set up on a property owned by William Davis at Ginninderra, about 3 km south of Hall. This settlement was known by residents as Ginninderra village. In 1881, the New South Wales Government surveyed the area for an official village and chose a site on Halls Creek.

The new village, called Ginninderra, was officially proclaimed in 1882, but following protests from local residents, was renamed Hall, in honour of Henry Hall, the first landholder in the area. The village was planned on a rectangular grid, and the first sale of land occurred in 1886.

In 1911, the Australian Capital Territory was gazetted and Hall lay within the boundary of the land allocated, near the new border with New South Wales. Hall had been one of the sites considered for a capital city, within the 'Yass-Canberra' district. However, following a survey of the various sites, by Charles Scrivener, in 1909, Canberra was selected as the site for the new national capital city.

Hall did not grow because, compared with the growing city of Canberra, it had few amenities. For example, it was not provided with town water until 1967. In 1954, the main street of Hall (which had been part of the state highway system since 1935) was named the Barton Highway.

In 1980, the highway alignment was shifted to the west as part of a dual-carriage upgrade, bypassing Hall completely, and the former section of the Barton Highway through Hall was renamed Victoria Street.

Churches and Schools
St. Francis Xavier's Catholic Church is located on 220 Victoria Street, Hall. It is one of the oldest churches in the Canberra region and was built in 1910 with the help of the Catholic Community of Hall. There is also an Anglican Church, St Michael and All Angels. Hall had a school, from 1911 to 2006; part of it is now a school museum, opened in 2005, and part is used as a pre-school.

Features and Attractions

Some features of note within Hall village are:
 Hall Pavilion and Showground. The showground area plays host to the Hall Markets, a popular monthly charity market showcasing hand-produced goods.
 Equestrian park and polocrosse grounds
 The National Sheep Dog Trial Championship, held each year at the showground
 The Hall Bushrangers Rugby Football Club, est. 1991
 Hall Premier Store and Post Office
 Hall ACT Rural Fire Service brigade
 Numerous historic buildings and cottages, including Cooee (1900), Glenowa (1900), Winarlia (1901) and Ottocliffe (1907).
 St. Francis Xavier's Catholic Church 
St. Michael & All Angels' Anglican Church 
 Memorial Avenue of trees
 Hall School Museum and Heritage Centre, located in the former Hall Primary School
 The Rotary Club of Hall, a rural-focused Rotary Club that runs the Capital Region Farmers Market as a community service project, with the aim of helping to increase agri-business opportunities in the region.

Geology

In the Hall area, the rocks volcanic, and date from the Silurian age. Green-grey and purple quartz andesite and dacite from the Hawkins Volcanics lie under the village and extend up the Halls Creek valley. Green-grey dacite and quartz andesite from the Hawkins Volcanics cover the surrounding areas, up to the New South Wales border, north to One Tree Hill, south-east to the Harcourt Hill and south to the north edge of Belconnen. Dark grey to green grey dacitic tuff is found over the New South Wales border, and also within the Australian Capital Territory near Gooromon Ponds Creek.

References

External links

 Hall website
 Capital Region Farmers Market
 Rotary Club of Hall
 National Sheep Dog Trial website

Proposed sites for national capital of Australia
Towns in the Australian Capital Territory